is a Japanese rakugo comedian best known for performing on the Shōten comedy show on Nippon TV. He is known as a master of the Japanese comic art of rakugo, in which a single performer or storyteller appears on stage and tells comedic stories to the audience.

Career 
In 1978, he entered Tokai University and joined the college rakugo club.

He first used Shōhachi as his stage name. In 1986, he became  and assumed his current stage name.

Since May 2006, he has appeared on Shōten as an  member. On May 22, 2016, it was announced that he would become the sixth host in the show's 50-year history.

Kōzamei

Filmography

Film 
 Cape Nostalgia (2014)
 The Crimes That Bind (2018)
 Whistleblower (2019), Takami Iiyama
 The Setting Sun (2022)

Television 
 Naotora: The Lady Warlord (2017), Imagawa Yoshimoto
 DCU (2022), Mamoru Hayakawa

References 

Rakugoka
Japanese male comedians
Japanese male film actors
Japanese male television actors
1959 births
Living people
Tokai University alumni
20th-century Japanese male actors
21st-century Japanese male actors